The Altamaha arcmussel (Alasmidonta arcula) is a species of freshwater mussel, an aquatic bivalve in the family Unionidae.

It is an endangered species.

Distribution
This species is endemic to the United States.

Habitat
This mussel lives in rivers.

Conservation status
This species is threatened by habitat loss.

References

Endemic fauna of the United States
Molluscs of the United States
Alasmidonta
Bivalves described in 1838
Taxonomy articles created by Polbot
Taxa named by Isaac Lea